Fiallo is a surname. Notable people with the surname include:

Cyrina Fiallo, American actress
Delia Fiallo (1924–2021), Cuban author and screenwriter
Fabio Fiallo (1866–1942), Dominican writer, poet and politician
Gregorio Fiallo (born 1952), Cuban swimmer
Larimar Fiallo (born 1983), Dominican beauty pageant titleholder
Viriato Fiallo (1895-1983), Dominican doctor and politician